Jordan Davies (born 24 June 1992) is a Welsh television personality and DJ, best known for his role on The Magaluf Weekender, and its successor Ibiza Weekender.

Early life
Davies was born in Cardiff, Wales. His father left his family when Davies was eighteen months old, and he and his younger brother were raised by their mother. He attended St. David's School in Pembrokeshire.

Career
Davies is known for his involvement in The Magaluf Weekender and its successor Ibiza Weekender, as well as Ex on the Beach during the third, fourth and fifth series. In 2017, Davies appeared as a housemate on the twentieth series of Celebrity Big Brother, but became the third housemate to be evicted on Day 15.

Filmography

References

Participants in British reality television series
Welsh television personalities
1992 births
Living people
Mass media people from Cardiff